General Simpson may refer to:

Colin Hall Simpson (1894–1964), Australian Army major general
Daniel L. Simpson (fl. 1990s–2020s), U.S. Air Force major general
Frank Simpson (British Army officer) (1899–1986), British Army general
James Simpson (British Army officer) (1792–1868), British Army general
Noel Simpson (general) (1907–1971), Australian Army major general
Ormond R. Simpson (1915–1998), U.S. Marine Corps lieutenant general
William Hood Simpson (1888–1980), United States Army general